The Jeanneau Storm is a French trailerable sailboat that was designed by E. G. van de Stadt as a cruiser-racer and first built in 1966.

Production
The design was built by Jeanneau in France, starting in 1966, but it is now out of production.

Design
The Storm is a recreational keelboat, built predominantly of fiberglass. It has a masthead sloop rig, a raked stem, a slightly angled transom, a transom-hung rudder controlled by a wheel and a fixed stub keel, with a retractable centerboard. It displaces  and carries  of ballast.

The design has sleeping accommodation for six people, with a double "V"-berth in the bow cabin, two straight settees in the main cabin and two aft quarter berths. The galley is located on the port side at the companionway ladder. The galley is equipped with a two-burner stove. The head is located just aft of the bow cabin on the starboard side.

See also
List of sailing boat types

References

External links

Keelboats
1960s sailboat type designs
Sailing yachts
Trailer sailers
Sailboat type designs by E. G. van de Stadt
Sailboat types built by Jeanneau